The Escouade de contre-terrorisme et de libération d’otages (ECTLO, “counter-terrorist and hostages rescue squad”), formerly named Groupe de combat en milieu clos (GCMC, “close quarters combat group”), was a special operations group of the French Navy, specialised in maritime anti-terrorism. It mainly consists of about 30 men, split in two groups of 15 people, one under Commando Jaubert command, and the other under Commando Trepel command.

The GCMC was founded in 1994, in the tradition of the former Élément léger d’intervention spéciale (ELIS, “special intervention light unit”). It is under direct command of COFUSCO, and has been renamed ECTLO in 2001.

The (then) GCMC, backed by the commando Hubert and other units, is credited with the arrest of Momčilo Krajišnik in April 2000.

External links
 Specwarnet.com report about GCMC
 Unofficial page

French naval components
Special forces of France